Georgian Păun (born 24 October 1985) is a Romanian footballer who plays as a striker. In his career Păun played for teams such as Dinamo București, Astra Ploiești, CSKA Sofia, FC Brașov, Petrolul Ploiești or Farul Constanța, among others.

Honours
Oțelul Galați
Liga III: 2020–21

References

External links

1985 births
Living people
Sportspeople from Ploiești
Romanian footballers
Association football forwards
Liga I players
Liga II players
FC Astra Giurgiu players
CSO Plopeni players
FC Petrolul Ploiești players
FC Gloria Buzău players
FC Dinamo București players
FC Politehnica Iași (1945) players
FC Brașov (1936) players
CS Sportul Snagov players
AFC Turris-Oltul Turnu Măgurele players
FCV Farul Constanța players
First Professional Football League (Bulgaria) players
PFC CSKA Sofia players
Romanian expatriate footballers
Romanian expatriate sportspeople in Bulgaria
Expatriate footballers in Bulgaria